Holst Peak is a rocky pyramidal peak, rising to about , midway between the south end of the Walton Mountains and the LeMay Range in the central part of Alexander Island, Antarctica. It was first mapped by D. Searle of the Falkland Islands Dependencies Survey in 1960 from air photos obtained by the Ronne Antarctic Research Expedition, 1947–48, and was named by the UK Antarctic Place-Names Committee for Gustav Holst, the English composer.

See also
 Mussorgsky Peaks
 Khufu Peak
 Oberon Peak

References

Mountains of Alexander Island